Big Dave is a comics character created and written by Grant Morrison and Mark Millar, with artwork by Steve Parkhouse, for 2000 AD.

The character was created for The Summer Offensive, an experiment in which the magazine was handed over to Millar, Morrison and John Smith for eight weeks.

Publication history

Big Dave first appeared in prog (the 2000 AD term for issue) #842 in his first story which featured Saddam Hussein trying to take over the world and turn everyone into "poofs" with the aid of some scary aliens. Big Dave, "the hardest man in Manchester", manages to stop Saddam's plan with the help of Terry Waite.

The next story featured the British Royal Family as robots plus The Princess of Wales and The Duchess of York as a pair of horny drunks. The story ends with Dave in bed with both royals.

A third story had Dave leading a minibus full of disabled children to the football world cup final where they defeat a German team managed by Adolf Hitler.

Bibliography

He has largely appeared in his own eponymous strip:

 Big Dave (written by Grant Morrison and Mark Millar):
 "Target Baghdad" (with  Steve Parkhouse, in 2000 AD #842–845, 1993)
 "Monarchy in the UK" (with  Steve Parkhouse, in 2000 AD #846–849, 1993)
 "Young Dave" (with  Steve Parkhouse, in 2000AD Yearbook 1994, 1993)
 "Costa del Chaos" (with  Anthony Williams, in 2000 AD #869–872, 1994)
 "Wotta Lotta Balls" (with  Steve Parkhouse, in 2000 AD #904–907, 1994)

External links
 Big Dave Retro Review
 Big Dave at 2000 AD online
 

2000 AD characters